Ofra Magidor is a philosopher and logician, and current Waynflete Professor of Metaphysical Philosophy at University of Oxford and Fellow of Magdalen College.

Biography 

Magidor received her BSc in mathematics, philosophy, and computer science from the Hebrew University of Jerusalem in 2002, and a BPhil in philosophy from the University of Oxford in 2004.  In 2007 she completed her DPhil, also from the University of Oxford.  She has lectured at Oxford since 2005, and in 2016 she became the Waynflete Professor of Metaphysical Philosophy, the second woman to hold this position.  In 2014, she was the recipient of the Philip Leverhulme Prize, in recognition of her outstanding research achievements which has attracted international acclaim.

Currently, Magidor is on the editorial boards of the journals Disputatio, Ergo, Thought, and Mind.

Her father is the mathematician Menachem Magidor.

Books 

 2013. Category Mistakes, (Oxford University Press). Paperback edition: Oxford University Press, 2016.

See also 
 Category mistake

References

External links 

 Staff profile Magdalen College
 Homepage
 Richard Marshall interviews Ofra Magidor

Living people
Year of birth missing (living people)